Åmli is the administrative centre of Åmli municipality in Agder county, Norway.

The village of Åmli is the location of the municipal government as well as Åmli Church, the main church for the municipality.  There is also a school, high school, library, and museum.  The village is the largest in the municipality, so it is also the main area of commerce in the municipality.  The Åmliavisa newspaper is published weekly from Åmli.  The southernmost part of the village is sometimes referred to as Lauveik.

Media gallery

References

Villages in Agder
Åmli